Adversarial information retrieval (adversarial IR) is a topic in information retrieval related to strategies for working with a data source where some portion of it has been manipulated maliciously.  Tasks can include gathering, indexing, filtering, retrieving and ranking information from such a data source. Adversarial IR includes the study of methods to detect, isolate, and defeat such manipulation.

On the Web, the predominant form of such manipulation is search engine spamming (also known as spamdexing), which involves employing various techniques to disrupt the activity of web search engines, usually for financial gain. Examples of spamdexing are link-bombing, comment or referrer spam, spam blogs (splogs), malicious tagging.  Reverse engineering of ranking algorithms, advertisement blocking, click fraud, and web content filtering may also be considered forms of adversarial data manipulation.

Topics 
Topics related to Web spam (spamdexing):

 Link spam
 Keyword spamming
 Cloaking
 Malicious tagging
 Spam related to blogs, including comment spam, splogs, and ping spam

Other topics:
 Click fraud detection
 Reverse engineering of  search engine's ranking algorithm
 Web content filtering
 Advertisement blocking
 Stealth crawling
Troll (Internet)
 Malicious tagging or voting in social networks
 Astroturfing
 Sockpuppetry

History 
The term "adversarial information retrieval" was first coined in 2000 by Andrei Broder (then Chief Scientist at Alta Vista) during the Web plenary session at the TREC-9 conference.

See also 
Information retrieval
Spamdexing

References

External links 
AIRWeb: series of workshops on Adversarial Information Retrieval on the Web
Web Spam Challenge: competition for researchers on Web Spam Detection
Web Spam Datasets: datasets for research on Web Spam Detection

Information retrieval genres
Internet fraud